The High Springs Historic District is a U.S. historic district (designated as such on October 31, 1991) located in High Springs, Florida. It contains 218 historic buildings.

References

External links
 Florida's Office of Cultural and Historical Programs - Alachua County
 Historic Markers in Alachua County

National Register of Historic Places in Alachua County, Florida
Historic districts on the National Register of Historic Places in Florida